Michael Edward Redmond (born December 27, 1947) is a Canadian former professional hockey player.  He is currently a color commentator for Detroit Red Wings games on television for Bally Sports Detroit.

Playing career
Redmond played right wing for the Montreal Canadiens from 1967-1971, winning Stanley Cups with them in 1968 and 1969.  He scored 27 goals for the Canadiens in the 1969–70 season.

Halfway through the 1970–71 NHL season he was traded to the Red Wings in a deal that sent superstar Frank Mahovlich to Montreal.  His promise was fulfilled the season following, when he scored 42 goals on a line centered by veteran star Alex Delvecchio.

In 1972–1973, Redmond became the seventh player in NHL history and the first Red Wing player to score fifty goals in a season.  He finished a career year with 52 goals, surpassing Gordie Howe's team record of 49, and 93 points.  Redmond's record would stand until John Ogrodnick tallied 55 goals during the 1985 season.  Delvecchio retired early in the 1973–74 season to become the team's coach, and Redmond was moved onto a line with budding superstar Marcel Dionne.  Redmond's success continued, and he became only the third player to achieve back to back fifty goal seasons with 51 goals (including an NHL leading 21 power play goals).

In the 1974–75 season Redmond sustained a back injury and played only 29 games.  His back woes continued the following year; after 37 games he retired early at the age of 28.  He had been named to the league's First All-Star Team in 1973, the Second Team in 1974, and he played in one All-Star Game in 1974.

Redmond's younger brother Dick was an NHL defenseman.  He played thirteen seasons, primarily with the Chicago Black Hawks and the Boston Bruins.

Career statistics

Regular season and playoffs

International

Broadcasting
After his playing career ended, Redmond became a color commentator on television. His television stops include CBC's Hockey Night in Canada, ESPN National Hockey Night, NHL on Fox and for most of his broadcasting career, local television coverage of the Red Wings with play-by-play announcers Dave Strader, Mike Goldberg and (currently) Ken Daniels. His catchphrases are referred to by fans as "Mickeyisms". In one memorable string Mickey used the following to describe a scramble in the crease- "Ten hungry lumberjacks, one pork chop left on the plate, and who should come up with it but Brett Hull!"

Redmond was a frequent guest on Drew and Mike In the Morning on WRIF. Redmond provided in-studio pre- and post-game commentary for WXYZ when ABC broadcast NHL games that featured the Red Wings, and currently does the same on NBC-broadcast Wings games for WDIV.

Redmond only does commentary for home games and away games with short trips, due to having coeliac disease and the difficulty of finding gluten-free meals over an extended trip. In those cases, his duties are covered by Chris Osgood or Larry Murphy.

In 2011, Redmond was the recipient of the Hockey Hall of Fame's Foster Hewitt Memorial Award. The award is an award named after Foster Hewitt and presented by the Hockey Hall of Fame to members of the radio and television industry who make outstanding contributions to their profession and the game of ice hockey during their broadcasting career. The award winners are selected by the NHL Broadcasters' Association.

See also
 List of people diagnosed with coeliac disease

References

Notes

External links

 

1947 births
Living people
Canadian ice hockey right wingers
Canadian sports announcers
Detroit Red Wings announcers
Detroit Red Wings captains
Detroit Red Wings players
Foster Hewitt Memorial Award winners
Houston Apollos players
Ice hockey people from Ontario
Montreal Canadiens players
National Hockey League broadcasters
Peterborough Petes (ice hockey) players
Stanley Cup champions
Sportspeople from Kirkland Lake